The Schwartz Center may refer to:

the Donna and Marvin Schwartz Center for Performing Arts at Emory University
the Joe and Barbara Schwartz Center, an arena in Wilmington, North Carolina
the Schwartz Center for Compassionate Healthcare, a healthcare-related nonprofit associated with MGH
the Schwartz Center for the Performing Arts at Cornell University
the Schwartz Center for the Arts at Dover University